George Alexander Pearre (July 16, 1860 – September 19, 1923) was an American politician.

Born in Cumberland, Maryland, Pearre attended private schools, the Allegany County Academy at Cumberland, St. James College near Hagerstown, and Princeton College.  He graduated from West Virginia University at Morgantown in 1880 and from the law department of the University of Maryland, Baltimore in 1882.  He was admitted to the bar in 1882 and commenced practice in Cumberland in 1887.  He later served as adjutant and lieutenant colonel in the Maryland National Guard from 1887 to 1892.

Pearre was elected to the Maryland State Senate in 1890, and served until 1892.  He was prosecuting attorney of Allegany County, Maryland, from 1895 to 1899, and was elected as a Republican to the Fifty-sixth and to the five succeeding Congresses, serving from March 4, 1899, to March 3, 1911.  He declined to be a candidate for reelection in 1910 to the Sixty-second Congress, and engaged in the practice of his profession until his death in Cumberland.  He is interred in Rose Hill Cemetery.

References

External links
 

1860 births
1923 deaths
Burials at Rose Hill Cemetery (Cumberland, Maryland)
Republican Party Maryland state senators
Lawyers from Cumberland, Maryland
People from Hagerstown, Maryland
Princeton University alumni
Republican Party members of the United States House of Representatives from Maryland
University of Maryland, Baltimore alumni
West Virginia University alumni
Politicians from Cumberland, Maryland